The following is a list of meteorology institutions around the world.

Government
 Agency of the Republic of Slovenia for the environment
 Australian Bureau of Meteorology
 Bangladesh Meteorological Department BMD
 Meteorological Service of Canada
 Canada
 Canadian Meteorological Centre
 Environment and Climate Change Canada
 Meteorological Service of Canada
 Canadian Ice Service
 Central Weather Bureau (Republic of China)
 China Meteorological Administration CMA
 Czech Hydrometeorological Institute
 Danish Meteorological Institute DMI
 Deutscher Wetterdienst (Germany) DWD
 Estonian Weather Service until 1. June 2013 EMHI (Estonian Meteorological and Hydrometeorogical Institute)
 Federal Service for Hydrometeorology and Environmental Monitoring of Russia
 Finnish Meteorological Institute FMI
 Hong Kong Observatory
 Hydrometeorological Institute of Montenegro
 India Meteorological Department
 Indian Institute of Tropical Meteorology
 Instituto Nacional de Meteorologia (Brazil)
 Japan Meteorological Agency JMA
 Korea Meteorological Administration KMA
 Macao Meteorological and Geophysical Bureau
 Met Éireann (Ireland)
 Météo-France MF
 Norwegian Meteorological Institute
 Pakistan Meteorological Department PMD
 Philippine Atmospheric, Geophysical and Astronomical Services Administration PAGASA
 Republic Hydrometeorological Institute of Serbia
 Royal Dutch Meteorological Institute KNMI
 Royal Meteorological Institute (Belgium) KMI
 Servizio Meteorologico (Italy)
 Slovak hydrometeorological institute SHMÚ
 Swedish Meteorological and Hydrological Institute (Sweden) SMHI
 Thai Meteorological Department
 The Met Office UKMO
 Hadley Centre for Climate Prediction and Research
 MeteoSwiss
 Meteorological Service of New Zealand Limited
 Meteorology, Climatology, and Geophysical Agency (Indonesia)
 National Institute of Water and Atmospheric Research (New Zealand)
 South African Weather Service SAWS
 United States:
 National Center for Atmospheric Research NCAR
 National Oceanic and Atmospheric Administration 
 National Severe Storms Laboratory 
 National Climatic Data Center
 National Weather Service 
 National Centers for Environmental Prediction 
 National Hurricane Center
 Storm Prediction Center
 Naval Maritime Forecast Center/Joint Typhoon Warning Center
 Zentralanstalt für Meteorologie und Geodynamik (Austria)
 Instituto Nacional De Meteorologia E Hidrologia (Venezuela)

Private weather consulting firms serving the United States
 AccuWeather
 Spire Global
 Tomorrow.io
 DTN

Multinational
 Caribbean Institute for Meteorology and Hydrology (CIMH)
 EGOWS
 European Centre for Medium-Range Weather Forecasts ECMWF
 European Organisation for the Exploitation of Meteorological Satellites
 Global Atmosphere Watch
 VAMOS Ocean-Cloud-Atmosphere-Land Study
 World Meteorological Organization WMO

Non-governmental organizations
 American Geophysical Union
 American Meteorological Society
 Australian Meteorological and Oceanographic Society
 Canadian Meteorological and Oceanographic Society
 European Geosciences Union
 National Weather Association
 Royal Meteorological Society

Education
 McGill Atmospheric and Oceanic Sciences
 Meteorological College (at the Japan Meteorological Agency)
 University of Miami (Florida)
 University of Oklahoma College of Atmospheric and Geographic Sciences
 Penn State College of Earth and Mineral Sciences
 Texas A&M College of Geosciences
 Toronto Magnetic and Meteorological Observatory (UToronto)

 01
Institutions
Meteorology
Meteorology